Damascus Roof and Tales of Paradise is a 2010 Syrian documentary film directed by Soudade Kaadan and produced by Anas Abdel Wahab. The film premiered at the 2010 Dubai International Film Festival.

Synopsis 
Syrian traditional story-telling, folklore, tales, fictional mythological characters play an important role in their culture. This tradition is passed generation to the next generation — from grandparents to grandchildren. However, in the modern era these stories are being lost. This is happening in Damascus, the capital and the second largest city of Syria, too.

Production 
The film is directed by Soudade Kaadan. This was her second documentary film. Anas Abdel Wahab produced the film.

References

External links 
 

2010 documentary films
2010 films
Syrian documentary films
Films set in Damascus